A New Beat from a Dead Heart is the fourth studio album by the American hardcore  band 108. The album was released on June 26, 2007, through Deathwish Inc.

Track listing

References

2007 albums
Deathwish Inc. albums
Albums produced by Kurt Ballou
108 (band) albums